Aladin Sallaku (born 4 February 1995) is an Albanian footballer who plays as a midfielder for Bylis in the Kategoria Superiore.

Career

Bylis
In January 2020, Sallaku moved to Albanian Superliga club Bylis on a free transfer. He made his league debut for the club on 3 June 2020, coming on as a 70th-minute substitute for Ardit Peposhi in a 3–1 home defeat to KF Tirana.

References

External links
Aladin Sallaku at SofaScore

1995 births
Living people
KF Apolonia Fier players
Besa Kavajë players
KS Turbina Cërrik players
KF Bylis Ballsh players
Kategoria Superiore players
Kategoria e Parë players
Association football midfielders
Footballers from Tirana
Albanian footballers